"Bullet with Butterfly Wings" is a song by the American alternative rock band the Smashing Pumpkins. It was released as the lead single from their 1995 double album Mellon Collie and the Infinite Sadness, and is the sixth track on the first disc. This song was the band's first top-40 US hit, peaking at number 22 on the Billboard Hot 100. It also spent six weeks at number two on the Billboard Modern Rock Tracks chart and peaked at number four on the Billboard Album Rock Tracks chart. In Canada, the song peaked at number 18 on the RPM Top Singles chart and spent four weeks at number one on the RPM Alternative 30 chart, becoming Canada's most successful rock song of 1995. It also reached number one in Iceland for a week.

The song won the Grammy Award for Best Hard Rock Performance in 1997. It was named the 91st best hard rock song of all time by VH1 in 2009 and ranked number 70 on the 2008 list of "The 100 Greatest Guitar Songs of All Time" of Rolling Stone. The song came second in the Triple J Hottest 100, 1995, was later voted number 51 in the Triple J Hottest 100 of All Time, 2009 and placed at number 25 in the Triple J Hottest 100 of the Past 20 Years, 2013.

Background
The song had its origins during the recording of 1993's Siamese Dream. According to frontman Billy Corgan, "I have a tape of us from 1993 endlessly playing the 'world is a vampire' part over and over". It was not until 1995 that Corgan finished the song with the noted chorus "rat in a cage", on an acoustic guitar during the same session that "Landslide" was recorded.

The lyrics "Can you fake it, for just one more show?" may refer to the band's experience headlining the 1994 Lollapalooza festival, with Corgan calling it "old Job". Along with other parts of the album, Corgan appears to compare himself to Jesus Christ, with the line "Tell me I'm the chosen one / Jesus was an only son".

Music video
Filming for the music video took place in late September 1995 with Samuel Bayer as director. The filming location was a quarry located in the Simi Valley California hills, most likely the mining pits of the Gillibrand Industrial Sands facility, located adjacent to the Big Sky Film Ranch The visual look of the video was inspired by the work of Brazilian photographer Sebastião Salgado on gold mining, while, in contrast, the band used the video to debut their new glam rock wardrobes - notably, Billy Corgan's black shirt with the word "Zero" written in silver, and silver pants. The video also marks the last filmed appearance of Billy Corgan prior to his decision to shave his head.

When asked why the band chose Bullet for the first video, Corgan responded "the record company did a survey of K-Mart shoppers between 30 and 40 and this is the song they came up with". "This is the blue light special", said Chamberlin, though it is likely in the context of the interview that these statements were sarcastic.

Critical reception
"Bullet with Butterfly Wings" is widely considered one of the Smashing Pumpkins' best songs. Louder Sound and Kerrang both ranked the song number three on their lists of the greatest Smashing Pumpkins songs.

Track listing
Original US/UK CD single

"...Said Sadly" features Nina Gordon of Veruca Salt on vocals.

1996 Re-issue

US 7" double A-side single

Charts

Weekly charts

Year-end charts

Certifications

Cover versions
 Punk rock band The Menzingers closed many of the shows on their 2013 tour with a cover of the song.
 Melodic hardcore band Four Year Strong covered this song on their 2009 album Explains It All which is a cover album tributing songs that were made famous by groups in the 1990s.
 Sigue Sigue Sputnik made a cover of the song for the 2001 compilation album A Gothic–Industrial Tribute to The Smashing Pumpkins.
 Groove metal band Skinlab covered this song on their 2004 compilation album Nerve Damage.
 Latin metal band Ill Niño covered this song on their 2010 album Dead New World.
 The Ghost and the Grace covered this song and released it as a one-off single in 2009.
 Hawthorne Heights made a cover of this song, released as part of a 2007 Smashing Pumpkins tribute album from MySpace Records.
Taking Back Sunday made a cover as a part of charity compilation called Songs That Saved My Life.
 Karen O recorded her version for the TV series Hanna, which was later included in the TV spot for Final Fantasy VII Remake.
 MØ made a cover of this song and released it as a one-off single in 2019.
 Frida Snell performed a cover of the song on her "Black Trillium" album released in April 22, 2002.

In other media
The song is used, slightly edited, as the title song for the Animal Planet reality television series Whale Wars, which follows the Sea Shepherd Conservation Society as they chase Japanese whalers in the Southern Ocean Whale Sanctuary. The song is also used in the South Park episode "Whale Whores", which parodies Whale Wars.

"Weird Al" Yankovic performed the chorus in "The Alternative Polka" from his Bad Hair Day album.

The song was featured as a playable track in the video game Guitar Hero 5.

It was also used in the launch trailer for Dead Space 2.

The song was the TNA Lockdown wrestling pay-per-view theme song for 2009.

Parts of the song were used in the exposition of the 2022 film Black Adam.

References

External links
 
 

The Smashing Pumpkins songs
1995 singles
Music videos directed by Samuel Bayer
Songs written by Billy Corgan
Song recordings produced by Flood (producer)
Song recordings produced by Billy Corgan
Grammy Award for Best Hard Rock Performance
Song recordings produced by Alan Moulder
Virgin Records singles
Grunge songs
Alternative metal songs
Number-one singles in Iceland
Songs containing the I–V-vi-IV progression